Oc, OC or O.C. may refer to:

Arts and entertainment
 The O.C., an American television show set in Orange County, California
 The O.C. (professional wrestling), a professional wrestling stable in WWE
 Opus clavicembalisticum, a piece for piano by Kaikhosru Shapurji Sorabji

Brands, businesses, and organizations
 OC Transpo, a public transit company in Ottawa and Carleton in Ontario, Canada
 Organisation Consul, a former terrorist organization active in Germany from 1920 to 1922
 Oregon Crusaders Drum and Bugle Corps, a Drum Corps International group commonly abbreviated as "OC"
 Ornithological Council
 Owens Corning, NYSE ticker symbol
 Oxi Clean, a cleaning product
 PGA Express (IATA code "OC" 2001–2015)
 Air California (IATA Code "OC" 1967–1987)

Education
 Oaklands College, a further education in central Hertfordshire, UK
 Oakwood College, a college in northern Alabama, USA, affiliated with the Seventh-day Adventist Church
 Oberlin College, a liberal arts college in Ohio
 Oklahoma Christian University
 Old Carthusian, one who attended Charterhouse School
 Old Colchestrian, one who attended Colchester Royal Grammar School
 Old Chigwellian, one who attended Chigwell School
 Orewa College, a college in the North Island, New Zealand

Places
 Oak Cliff, a community in Dallas, Texas
 Oakland–Alameda County Coliseum, a stadium in Oakland, California and the home of the Oakland Raiders
 Oakland County, Michigan
 Ocean City, Maryland
 Ocean City, New Jersey
 Ocean County, New Jersey
 Oceanside, California
 Oconee County, Georgia
 Oconee County, South Carolina
 Oklahoma City, Oklahoma
 Old Colwyn, Wales
 Osceola, Indiana
 Orange County, California
 Orange County, Florida
 Orange County, Indiana
 Orange County, New York
 Orange County, North Carolina
 Orange County, Texas
 Orange County, Vermont
 Orange County, Virginia
 Oregon City, Oregon
 Ottawa—Carleton, a federal electoral district in Ontario, Canada

Roles and titles
 Officer of the Order of Canada, post-nominal letters for a grade within the Canadian order
 Offensive coordinator, a coaching position in American and Canadian football
 Officer candidate
 Officer in charge (police)
 Officer commanding, in military use

Technology
 Oleoresin capsaicin or oleoresin capsicum, the active ingredient in pepper spray and OC gas
 OC spray, also known as pepper spray
 Open collector, electrical interface. Used in data communication
 openCanvas, a raster graphics software
 Optical Carrier levels in the SONET fiber-optic network specification
 Oral contraceptive, usually referring to the combined oral contraceptive pill
 Organ-on-a-chip, microfluidic device that simulates whole physiological and mechanical organ responses
 Overclocking, the process of forcing a computer component to run at a higher clock rate than it was designed for
 Overcurrent, an excessive value of electric current

Languages
 Occitan language (ISO 639 alpha-2 oc)
 Old Chinese, the earliest attested stage of the Chinese language

Other uses
 o.c. or op. cit., opere citato
 O.C. (rapper) (born 1971), American rapper
 Offering circular, in finance, for a bond offering
 Order of Carmelites, a Roman Catholic order
 Organized crime, in law
 On-center, in construction, indicating that the distance quoted is between the centers of neighboring wall studs, joists, or other members
 Original content, original character, or original contribution, used to assert one's authorship of a given subject matter
 Outrigger canoe

See also
°C
 0C (disambiguation), the number–letter combination
Orange County (disambiguation)